This is a list of villages and settlements in Plateau State, Nigeria, organised within a local government area (LGA) or district (with postal codes also given).

By postal code

By electoral ward
Below is a list of polling units, including villages and schools, organised by electoral ward.

References

Plateau
Plateau State